Flemington was an electoral district of the Victorian Legislative Assembly. It was created in 1904 with the abolition of Essendon and Flemington. The new seat was won by the former Labor member for the abolished seat, Edward Warde.

Flemington was abolished in 1945 when several new districts were created, including Moonee Ponds. Flemington was created again in 1955 but was abolished once more in 1967, with its territory being incorporated into Essendon.

Members

Election results

References

Former electoral districts of Victoria (Australia)
1904 establishments in Australia
1945 disestablishments in Australia
1955 establishments in Australia
1967 disestablishments in Australia